Jimmy Jazz may refer to:

"Jimmy Jazz", a song by The Clash from their 1979 album London Calling
Jimmy Jazz Records, a Polish record label with bands such as The Analogs, WC and Karcer
Jimmy Jazz, a 1982 movie starring Fabrice Luchini
"Jimmy Jazz", a song by Kortatu from their 1985 album Kortatu